New Hope is an unincorporated community in Perquimans County, North Carolina, United States.

A variant name was "Durants Neck". Durants Neck was named after George Durant, a pioneer citizen.

References

Unincorporated communities in Perquimans County, North Carolina
Unincorporated communities in North Carolina